Lechon manok is a Filipino spit-roasted chicken dish made with chicken marinated in a mixture of garlic, bay leaf, onion, black pepper, soy sauce, and patis (fish sauce). The marinade may also be sweetened with muscovado or brown sugar. It is distinctively stuffed with tanglad (lemongrass) and roasted over charcoal. It is typically eaten dipped in a toyomansi or silimansi mixture of soy sauce, calamansi, and labuyo chilis. It is paired with white rice or puso and commonly served with atchara pickles as a side dish. It is a very popular dish in the Philippines and is readily available at roadside restaurants.

See also 
 Inihaw
 Asado
 Chicken inasal
 Lechon
 Lechon kawali
 List of spit-roasted foods

References

Philippine chicken dishes
Barbecue
Spit-cooked foods